Michael Orozco Fiscal (born February 7, 1986) is an American professional soccer player who plays as a center-back for USL Championship club Orange County SC.

Early life
Orozco grew up in Anaheim, California. His parents are originally from Mexico, and Michael joined the youth program of Mexican Primera A team San Luis in 2002.

Career

Professional
Michael Orozco made his professional debut for San Luis during the Apertura 2006 tournament, when he entered as a second-half substitute against Tigres UANL, but was sent off after just two minutes. He played in 106 league matches for the club until its move to Chiapas.

In January 2010, Orozco left San Luis to join MLS side Philadelphia Union on loan. After one season, Philadelphia decided not to exercise its purchase option on Orozco and he returned to San Luis.

Orozco was loaned to Puebla for the 2013 Clausura. The move was extended the following summer.

Orozco scored the first goal of his Puebla career in a 2–1 loss to Cruz Azul.

International
Orozco was called into numerous United States under-23 camps in preparation for the 2008 CONCACAF Men's Olympic Qualifying Tournament. He helped the team qualify for the 2008 Summer Olympics with stellar performances on defense. He was included in the Best XI of the 2008 CONCACAF Men's U23 Championship All-Tournament Team.

On July 17, 2008, Orozco was named to the United States team for the 2008 Olympics in Beijing. Orozco started all three matches for the United States.

On August 13, 2008, Orozco received a red card in the third minute of the United States's 2–1 loss to Nigeria in the final group stage match of the 2008 Olympics for throwing an intentional elbow to the chest of Solomon Okoronkwo. The loss subsequently caused the United States to fail to advance from the group stage.

On August 28, 2008, Orozco was called up to his first full national team camp in preparation for 2010 World Cup qualifying matches against Cuba and Trinidad and Tobago.

On October 15, 2008, he debuted in the latter match, playing the full 90 minutes in a 2–1 loss.

On August 10, 2011, he returned to the starting lineup in a friendly against Mexico, a 1–1 draw. The match was the United States's first under newly-appointed head coach Jürgen Klinsmann.

On August 15, 2012, Orozco featured again against Mexico, scoring the lone goal in a 1–0 win for the United States, its first-ever away win over Mexico. The United States's all-time record in Mexico improved to 1-1-23, and Mexico suffered only its ninth loss in 120 matches at Estadio Azteca.

Career statistics

Club

International

International goals
Scores and results list United States goal tally first.

Honors
Puebla
Copa MX: Clausura 2015

Orange County SC
USL Championship: 2021

United States
CONCACAF Gold Cup: 2013

References

External links

 
 U.S. Soccer player profile

1986 births
Living people
American soccer players
American sportspeople of Mexican descent
Association football defenders
Liga MX players
Major League Soccer players
San Luis F.C. players
Philadelphia Union players
Club Puebla players
Club Tijuana footballers
Orange County SC players
Sportspeople from Orange, California
Footballers at the 2008 Summer Olympics
Olympic soccer players of the United States
Soccer players from California
United States men's under-23 international soccer players
United States men's international soccer players
2013 CONCACAF Gold Cup players
Copa América Centenario players
CONCACAF Gold Cup-winning players
American expatriate sportspeople in Mexico